The General Social Survey (GSS) is a sociological survey created and regularly collected since 1972 by the National Opinion Research Center at the University of Chicago and funded by the National Science Foundation.  The GSS collects information and keeps a historical record of the concerns, experiences, attitudes, and practices of residents of the United States.

Since 1972, the GSS has been monitoring societal change and studying the growing complexity of American society. It is one of the most influential studies in the social sciences and is frequently referenced in leading publications, including The New York Times, The Wall Street Journal, and the Associated Press.

The GSS aims to gather data on contemporary American society to monitor and explain trends and constants in attitudes, behaviors, and attributes; to examine the structure and functioning of society in general as well as the role played by relevant subgroups; to compare the United States to other societies to place American society in comparative perspective and develop cross-national models of human society; and to make high-quality data easily accessible to scholars, students, policy-makers, and others, with minimal cost and waiting.

The data collected for this survey includes both demographic information and respondents' opinion on matters ranging from government spending to the state of race relations to the existence and nature of God. Because of the wide range of topics covered and the comprehensive gathering of demographic information, survey results allow social scientists to correlate demographic factors like age, race, gender, and urban/rural upbringing with beliefs and thereby determine whether, for example, an average middle-aged black male respondent would be more or less likely to move to a different U.S. state for economic reasons than a similarly situated white female respondent; or whether a highly educated person with a rural upbringing is more likely to believe in a transcendent God than a person with an urban upbringing and only a high school education.

GSS results are made available freely to interested parties over the internet and are widely used in sociological research.  The data are generally available in formats designed for statistical programs (e.g., R/SAS/SPSS/Stata), and the GSS Data Explorer allows users to search GSS information, test hypotheses, and look for interesting correlations directly on the website.

In 2011 the GSS was linked to the National Death Index. This freely available dataset allows researchers to explore the association between variables in the General Social Survey and human longevity. For instance, it is possible to explore the association between happiness and life expectancy. The dataset and codebook are available for download to the public.

Objectives 
The General Social-Survey has three main purposes:
 Gather data to monitor and explain trends, changes, and constants in attitudes, behaviors, and attributes as well as examine the structure, development, and functioning of society in general as well as the role of various sub-groups.
 Compare the United States to other societies to place American society in comparative perspective and develop cross-national models of human society.
 Make up-to-date, important, high-quality data easily accessible to scholars, students, policy makers, and others with minimal cost and waiting.

History 
The GSS was first conducted in 1972. Until 1994, it was conducted almost annually (with the exceptions of the years 1979, 1981, and 1992). Since 1994, the GSS has been conducted in even-numbered years.

In 1984 the GSS was a cofounder of the International Social Survey Programme (ISSP), a collaboration between different nations conducting surveys covering topics for social science research. The first ISSP questions were asked as part of the GSS. Since 1985 the ISSP has conducted an annual cross-national survey and the GSS has participated in each ISSP round.

In 1991, the first auxiliary study to the GSS, the National Organizations Study (NOS), was conducted. This study used a hyper networking sampling method that gathered its sample of national employers by asking the scientifically-selected sample of GSS respondents for information on their place of work.

In 1998, the second auxiliary study to the GSS, the National Congregations Study, was conducted.

In 2002, the survey moved its questionnaire to computer-assisted personal interviewing (CAPI) methods from the previous method of paper-based questionnaires. Also in this year, the second National Organizations Study was conducted, again using the GSS to build its sample.

In 2006, a large part of the GSS was administered in Spanish for the first time. In addition, the National Voluntary Associations Study, which also gathered its sample from the GSS by asking respondents about the voluntary associations in which they took part, was conducted. Also in this year, the second wave of the National Congregations Study was conducted, its sample again built using the GSS.

From 2008 through 2014, in addition to the sample of respondents selected randomly every round, the GSS sample included one to two rotating panel samples consisting of cases interviewed in a previous round of the survey. Also in this year, the full GSS interview was translated into and administered in Spanish for Spanish-speaking United States residents.

In 2012, the third wave of the National Congregations Study was conducted, its sample again built using the GSS.

Methodology 
The target population of the GSS is adults (18+) living in households in the United States. The GSS sample is drawn using an area probability design that randomly selects respondents in households across the United States to take part in the survey. Respondents that become part of the GSS sample are from a mix of urban, suburban, and rural geographic areas. Participation in the study is strictly voluntary. However, because only about a few thousand respondents are interviewed in the main study, every respondent selected is very important to the results.

The survey is conducted face-to-face with an in-person interview by NORC at the University of Chicago. The survey was conducted every year from 1972 to 1994 (except in 1979, 1981, and 1992). Since 1994, it has been conducted every other year. The survey takes about 90 minutes to administer. As of 2014, 30 national samples with 59,599 respondents and 5,900+ variables have been collected.

Results 

GSS results are freely made available to interested parties over the internet and are widely used in sociological research. The data are generally available in formats designed for statistical programs (e.g., R/SAS/SPSS/Stata). The GSS Data Explorer on the General Social Survey website allows any user to download GSS data and search for information about GSS questions, variables, and publications, as well as conduct basic analyses directly on the website freely without the need for statistical software.

The latest available results are those of the 2018 survey.

More than 25,000 journal articles, books and other research uses are based on the GSS and over 1,000 have been appearing annually in recent years. In addition, about 400,000 students use the GSS in their classes each year. The GSS webpage on the NORC website keeps a current list of the most recent major news reports and media coverage that references GSS data.

See also 

European Social Survey
German General Social Survey
International Social Survey Programme

References

External links 
 General Social Survey – Official website for the GSS
 The GSS Data Explorer allows users to search GSS information, test hypotheses, and look for interesting correlations
 GSS Overview on NORC Website
 SDA – GSS 1972–2016 Cumulative Datafile – Tool from Berkeley for querying GSS data

Statistical data sets
Social statistics data